The Hudson Highlands are mountains on both sides of the Hudson River in New York state lying primarily in Putnam County on its east bank and Orange County on its west.  They continue somewhat to the south in Westchester County and Rockland County, respectively.

North to south they fall between Newburgh Bay and Haverstraw Bay, the latter forming the northern region of the New York - New Jersey Highlands.

The Hudson River enters this region in the south at Dunderberg Mountain near Stony Point, and from the north in the vicinity of Breakneck Ridge and Storm King Mountain near Cornwall, New York. These highlands have played a significant role in America's environmental, cultural, and military history.

Geology
The bedrock of the Highlands is part of the Reading Prong and more than a billion years old, formed during the Grenville Orogeny. It represents the very core of the Appalachian range, which has been formed by successive mountain-building events (orogenies).  The present mountains have been exposed by the process of isostasy through the late Cenozoic Era. The hills were given their rounded form when glaciers cut through the Appalachian Mountains here. The Highlands are among the lowest summits in that range, and the Appalachian Trail reaches its lowest elevation in the Trailside Zoo between Bear Mountain State Park and Bear Mountain Bridge. Conversely, the river becomes narrower and deeper through the Highlands, reaching its deepest point of 216 feet (66 m), near Garrison. Many stretches are challenging to navigate, earning nicknames like "World's End."

History
Prior to European exploration, the Hudson Highlands were inhabited by Native American Lenape people. Henry Hudson and his crew on the Half Moon were the first Europeans known to see the Highlands when they explored the river in 1609.

The mountains became strategically important during the American Revolutionary War, when it was important for the Continental Army to hold the river valley and prevent the British from cutting New England off from the rest of the colonies. During the Revolutionary War, to prevent British shipping from using the river, the Hudson River Chain was forged at the Sterling Iron Works in Warwick, New York, a town in Orange County. From 1778 to 1782, the chain was stretched across the river from the Fort Clinton at West Point. The site of the fort is today the easternmost point of the grounds of the United States Military Academy. The only surviving piece of the boom and chain is currently on display at Washington's Headquarters State Historic Site in Newburgh, New York.

Several decades after independence, Thomas Cole started an artistic movement by painting America's wild and rugged landscapes— especially, at first, the Highlands— with the stark contrasts and shadows they offered, in a way that suggested raw nature, a world reborn. After the movement had faded, a critic derisively referred to the movement as the Hudson River School; the name stuck as the label for the new nation's first homegrown artistic movement.

In the early 20th century, in response to damage caused by quarrymen and loggers in the Highlands, local conservationists began to press for public ownership of the area's woods and mountains. Their efforts paid off in the first of several state parks that now blanket the chain.

Later that century, an ambitious power-generating plan that would have dug into Storm King Mountain led to a landmark lawsuit by environmental groups that made history when the judge ruled that aesthetic impacts of such large projects could be considered and that a coalition of citizen groups had legal standing. This landmark lawsuit formed the basis for a large body of case law concerning environmentalism.

Mountains of the Hudson Highlands

East (north to south)
Bald Hill
Lamb's Hill
Lamb's Hill West
Beacon Mountain (North and South)
Scofield Ridge (highest point in Putnam County, in Philipstown)
Sugarloaf Mountain
Breakneck Ridge
Bull Hill aka Mt. Taurus
South Redoubt and North Redoubt aka Fort Hill
Fort Defiance Hill
Denning Hill
Sunset Point
Sugarloaf Hill
White Rock
Canada Hill
Anthony's Nose
Manitou Mountain

West (north to south)
Storm King Mountain
Black Rock
Crow's Nest
Popolopen Torne
Bear Mountain
West Mountain
Bald Mountain
Spy Rock
Eagles Cliff
Dunderberg Mountain
Long Mountain
Sutherland Ridge
Stillman Hill
Arthur Hill
Chatfield Hill
Buckberg

Protected areas of the Hudson Highlands

Bear Mountain State Park
Black Rock Forest
Harriman State Park
Hudson Highlands State Park
Manitoga
Sterling Forest State Park
Storm King State Park

Gallery

References

External links

USGS - The Highlands Province
NYS - Hudson Highlands State Park 

 
Hudson Valley
Landforms of Orange County, New York
Landforms of Rockland County, New York
Landforms of Dutchess County, New York
Landforms of Putnam County, New York
Tourist attractions in Dutchess County, New York
Mountain ranges of New York (state)
Highlands